City on a Hill: Songs of Worship and Praise (released in 2000) is the first in the City on a Hill series of compilation albums by popular Contemporary Christian Music musicians. It received the Gospel Music Association's Special Event Album of the Year award for 2001.

Track listing
"God of Wonders" – Third Day, Caedmon's Call (Marc Byrd, Steve Hindalong) - 5:09
"The Stone" – Jars of Clay (Jonathan Noël) - 4:03
"With Every Breath" – Sixpence None The Richer, Jars of Clay (Marc Byrd) - 5:02
"I Remember You" – Third Day, Gene Eugene (Gene Eugene, Steve Hindalong) - 4:35
"Precious Jesus" – Leigh Nash, The Choir (Steve Hindalong) - 4:35
"You're Here" – Sixpence None The Richer (Leigh Nash) - 4:07
"Where You Are" – FFH (Jeromy Deibler) - 4:09
"Merciful Rain" – FFH (Steve Hindalong) - 3:56
"Unified" – Sonicflood, Peter Furler (Peter Furler) - 4:12
"Covenant Song" – Caedmon's Call (Aaron Senseman) - 5:04
"City on a Hill" – Third Day (Mac Powell, Third Day) - 3:53
"Marvelous Light" – Gene Eugene (Steve Hindalong) - 3:02
"This Road" – Jars of Clay (Dan Haseltine, Charlie Lowell, Stephen Mason, Matt Odmark)  - 5:14

Personnel 
Vocalists
 Mac Powell – vocals (1, 4, 11)
 Cliff Young – vocals (1, 10), backing vocals (12)
 Danielle Young – vocals (1, 10), backing vocals (12)
 Christine Glass – backing vocals (1, 8, 12), vocals (9)
 Leigh Nash – prelude vocals (1), vocals (3, 5, 6), backing vocals (12)
 Dan Haseltine – vocals (2, 3, 13), backing vocals (12)
 Charlie Lowell – vocals (2), backing vocals (11)
 Stephen Mason – vocals (2, 13), backing vocals (11)
 Matt Odmark – vocals (2)
 Derri Daughtery – vocals (5), backing vocals (12)
 Jeromy Deibler – vocals (7), backing vocals (8, 12)
 Brian Smith – vocals (7)
 Jennifer Deibler – vocals (8), backing vocals (12)
 Peter Furler – vocals (9)
 Gene Eugene – vocals (12)
 Marc Byrd – backing vocals (12)
 Riki Michele – backing vocals (12)
 The Lufkin Texas Civic Center Choir – choir (13)

Musicians
 Pete Kipley – keyboards (2, 5, 12), programming (2)
 Jonathan Noël – acoustic piano (2)
 Gene Eugene – acoustic piano (4), Wurlitzer electric piano (7, 12), xylophone (12)
 Jason Halbert – keyboards (9), programming (9)
 Otto Price – programming (9)
 Dwayne Larring – programming (9), guitars (9)
 Joshua Moore – Wurlitzer electric piano (10)
 Scotty Wilbanks – acoustic piano (11), Hammond B3 organ (11)
 Charlie Lowell – accordion (13)
 Marc Byrd – acoustic guitar (1, 3, 6, 8), electric guitar (1, 3, 7, 8, 9, 12), slide guitar (11)
 Stephen Mason – acoustic guitar (2), electric guitar (2)
 Phil Madeira – lap steel guitar (3, 7), accordion (7)
 Derri Daughtery – acoustic guitar (5, 11), electric guitar (5, 10), electric guitar swells (8, 12)
 Matt Slocum – electric guitar (6), cello (6)
 Michael Boggs – acoustic guitar (7)
 Derek Webb – acoustic guitar (10)
 Stephen Mason – electric guitar (10), acoustic guitar (13), mandolin (13)
 Brad Avery – 12-string guitar (11)
 Mark Lee – acoustic guitar (11), electric guitar (11)
 Matt Odmark – acoustic guitar (13)
 Chris Donahue – bass guitar (1, 2, 3, 5, 8), bass (6, 7)
 Rick Heil – bass guitar (9)
 Jeff Miller – bass guitar (10)
 Tai Anderson – bass guitar (11)
 Aaron Sands – bass (13)
 Dennis Holt – drums (1, 8)
 Aaron Blanton – drums (9)
 Todd Bragg – drums (10)
 David Carr – drums (11)
 Dale Baker – percussion (1, 6), drums (3, 6)
 Garrett Buell – percussion (1, 10), timpani (6), orchestra bells (6, 11)
 Steve Hindalong – percussion (1, 2, 6-9, 13), drums (2, 5, 13), tambourine (3, 11), acoustic guitar (5), xylophone (5), orchestra bells (13)
 Sam Levine – flute (7)
 Tom Howard – orchestrations and conductor (1, 2, 4, 10)
 Jacob Lawson – string arrangements (8), violin (13)

References

External links
Official web site
"City on a Hill, Essential Records press release", archived at jarchives.com.

Songs of Worship and Praise
2000 compilation albums